"Andrew in Drag" is a song by American indie pop band The Magnetic Fields, released as the first single from their album Love at the Bottom of the Sea (2012). The song - written from the point of view of a straight man who sees a straight friend perform in drag and is highly aroused by it - deals with the confusing nature, complexity, and evanescent quality of lust.

Cover versions 

The song has been covered by The Shins.

References

External links 

 

2012 singles
The Magnetic Fields songs
2012 songs
Songs written by Stephin Merritt
LGBT-related songs
Songs about cross-dressing